Anatoli Alexeyevich Filatov (born April 28, 1975) is a professional Kazakhstani ice hockey player, who played for Team Kazakhstan. He drafted 158th overall in the round seven of 1993 NHL Entry Draft by San Jose Sharks, but never actually signed a contract with them.  He played Right Wing for Niagara Falls Thunder and Sibir Novosibirsk but never actually signed a contract with any of the other teams listed

External links

1975 births
HC Sibir Novosibirsk players
HC Spartak Moscow players
Kazakhstani ice hockey right wingers
Kazzinc-Torpedo players
Living people
Niagara Falls Thunder players
Sportspeople from Oskemen
Salavat Yulaev Ufa players
San Jose Sharks draft picks
Torpedo Nizhny Novgorod players
Asian Games gold medalists for Kazakhstan
Medalists at the 1999 Asian Winter Games
Asian Games medalists in ice hockey
Ice hockey players at the 1999 Asian Winter Games